Guinea-Bissau competed at the 2020 Summer Olympics in Tokyo. Originally scheduled to take place from 24 July to 9 August 2020, the Games were postponed to 23 July to 8 August 2021, because of the COVID-19 pandemic. It was the nation's seventh consecutive appearance at the Summer Olympics.

Competitors
The following is the list of number of competitors in the Games.

Athletics

Guinea-Bissau received universality slots from IAAF to send two athletes (one male and one female) to the Olympics.

Track & road events

Judo

Guinea-Bissau qualified one judoka for the women's half-lightweight category (52 kg) at the Games. Rio 2016 Olympian Taciana Cesar accepted a continental berth from Africa as the nation's top-ranked judoka outside of direct qualifying position in the IJF World Ranking List of June 28, 2021.

Wrestling

Guinea-Bissau qualified two wrestlers for each of the following classes into the Olympic competition; all of whom progressed to the top two finals of the men's freestyle wrestling (57 and 74 kg) at the 2021 African & Oceania Qualification Tournament in Hammamet, Tunisia.

Freestyle

References

Nations at the 2020 Summer Olympics
2020
2021 in Bissau-Guinean sport